David Berry is a special effects artist who won at the 58th Academy Awards in the category for Best Visual Effects for his work on the film Cocoon. His win was shared with Scott Farrar, Ralph McQuarrie and Ken Ralston.

Selected filmography
 Star Wars (1977)
 The Empire Strikes Back (1980)
 Raiders of the Lost Ark (1981)
 E.T. the Extra-Terrestrial (1982)
 Star Trek II: The Wrath of Khan (1982)
 Return of the Jedi (1983)
 Indiana Jones and the Temple of Doom (1984)
 Star Trek III: The Search for Spock (1984)
 Cocoon (1985)

References

External links

Living people
Year of birth missing (living people)
Best Visual Effects Academy Award winners
Special effects people
Place of birth missing (living people)